Guillebert de Lannoy (also Gilbert, Guilbert or Ghillebert; 1386–1462), was a Flemish traveler and diplomat, chamberlain to the duke of Burgundy, governor of the fort of Sluys, and a knight of the Golden Fleece.

He was the son of Guillebert I de Lannoy and Catherine of Molembais. He was a member of the noble de Lannoy family.
His brothers were Hugo of Lannoy and Baldwin of Lannoy, also founding Knights of the Golden Fleece.

Guillebert first served Jean de Werchin, seneschal of Hainaut, and accompanied him to the East and to Spain. He then served John the Fearless in his war against the Prince-Bishopric of Liège and the Armagnac–Burgundian Civil War. He then joined the Teutonic Knights in the Polish–Lithuanian–Teutonic War.
Guillebert also fought in 1415 against the English in the Battle of Azincourt or Agincourt, where he was wounded and captured. 
 
In the service of Philip the Good, he discharged several diplomatic missions in France, England (as Ambassador to Henry V of England), Teutonic Knights, Poland, Grand Duchy of Lithuania, and Grand Duchy of Moscow and was one of the negotiators of the Treaty of Troyes (1420). In 1421 he was sent by Henry V of England to Palestine to inquire into the possibility of reviving the Kingdom of Jerusalem, and wrote an account of his travels, Les Pelerinages de Surye et de Egipte, which was published in 1826 and again in 1842.

His travels in the Baltic region and Russia are recounted in his book Voyages et Ambassades, published in Mons in 1840 with subsequent editions. Around 1440 Lannoy wrote L'Instruction de josne prince ("Advice for a Young Prince"), which he dressed up with a fictional origin in the court of Norway "long, long ago", followed by a rediscovery of the manuscript text.  The dedication miniature in Charles the Bold's copy of 1468-70 illustrates the Norwegian story, but using up-to-date Burgundian costume and, it seems, the faces of the ducal family.  Charles, around seven when the work was written, had no doubt always been the young prince Lannoy had in mind.

Notes

References 
 
 
 Oscar Halecki, "Gilbert de Lannoy and His Discovery of East Central Europe" Bulletin of the Polish Institute of Arts & Sciences in America, 2:2 (1944), 314-31.
 Genealogie online (in Dutch)
Kren, T. &  McKendrick, Scot (eds), Illuminating the Renaissance – The Triumph of Flemish Manuscript Painting in Europe, Getty Museum/Royal Academy of Arts, 2003, 
 

1386 births
1462 deaths
15th-century diplomats
15th-century soldiers
Burgundian knights
Lannoy
Guillebert
Nobility of the Burgundian Netherlands